The Czarna Hańcza, Chornaya Hancha is the largest river of the Suwałki Region of north-eastern Poland and the Sapockin region of north-western Belarus. It is known for having large postglacial boulders. Originating near Lake Hańcza (the deepest lake in Poland with the maximum depth of 108.5 m) and flowing through lake Hańcza and Wigry Lake (the location of Poland's Wigry National Park), it is a tributary of the river Neman beyond the borders of Belarus and Lithuania. It flows through the city Suwałki.

See also
 Augustów Canal
 Biała Hańcza

References

External links
 

Rivers of Poland
Rivers of Podlaskie Voivodeship
Rivers of Grodno Region
Rivers of Lithuania
Rivers of Belarus